Khamosh Raho  is a 2011 Pakistani Urdu language film directed by Altaf Hussain. It stars Shaan Shahid and Juggan Kazim in lead roles.

Plot
Ghulam Mohiuddin, plays an undefeated attorney who happens to have hit the wrong note with a criminal top dog named Chandia. Mohiuddinson (Sheraz Ghafoor) is profoundly in love with the evil, sadistic villain's daughter (Mariam Khan); the lawyer also has another son (Shaan Shahid) who runs away from home to come home two decades later only to find his mother fall sick when she first sees him. Then there's Chandia's evil police deputy stepbrother, who wants his son married to Chandia's daughter.

Cast
 Shaan Shahid
 Juggan Kazim
 Arbaz Khan
 Sheraz Ghafoor
 Mariam Khan
 Bahar Begum
 Naghma
 Asif Khan
 Kinza Malik as Malkin
 Chacha Kunjar

Production

Music

List of tracks

See also
 Lists of Pakistani films
 Pakistani films of 2011
 Cinema of Pakistan

References

2011 films
Pakistani crime films
2010s Urdu-language films
Films scored by M Arshad
Pakistani romance films